Tatiana Salcuțan (born 16 April 2001) is a Moldovan swimmer. She competed at the 2020 Summer Olympics.

Career 
In 2015, she won the silver medal at the European Youth Olympic Festival. and went on to win the silver medal at the Youth Swimming European Championships, which took place in Hódmezővásárhely, Hungary in 2016. She competed at the 2018 Summer Youth Olympics, winning a gold medal.

She competed in the women's 100 metre backstroke event at the 2017 World Aquatics Championships.

References

External links
 

 

2001 births
Living people
Moldovan female backstroke swimmers
Place of birth missing (living people)
Swimmers at the 2018 Summer Youth Olympics
Youth Olympic gold medalists for Moldova
Swimmers at the 2020 Summer Olympics
Olympic swimmers of Moldova